The New Jersey Hall of Fame is an organization that honors individuals from the U.S. state of New Jersey who have made contributions to society and the world beyond.

The Hall of Fame is a designated 501(c)(3) non-profit organization, overseen by a Board of Trustees. It was statutorily authorized through Public Law 2005, Chapter 232. This bi-partisan legislation was passed unanimously in the New Jersey Senate on May 13, 2005, passed in the Assembly on June 30, 2005, and signed into law by the governor on September 22, 2005.

In June 2013 it introduced a "mobile museum" designed by Michael Graves and Ralph Applebaum which toured the state for more than 300,000 people over three years. In 2017, it opened a satellite exhibition of five holograms, posters and a ″Wall of Fame″  at Newark Airport. In September 2018 it was announced that the Hall of Fame would move to a permanent home at American Dream Meadowlands.

Format
The New Jersey Hall of Fame selects potential nominees in five categories: General, Enterprise, Sports, Arts & Entertainment, and Historical. With only rare exceptions, nominees must have resided in New Jersey for a period of at least five years. Selection of inductees is done using a three-phase process. Phase I is conducted by a group of expert panelists selected by the New Jersey Hall of Fame Board, who compose a list of 20 individuals in each category. Phase II incorporates a group of over 100 prominent organization throughout New Jersey who narrow the field down to 6 individuals in each category. Phase III uses a public voting system via the internet and manual ballots. Upon completion of Phase III, the New Jersey Hall of Fame Board selects its inductees based on the top vote-getter in each category, as well as others the board deems deserving.

Induction ceremony
The first class of inductees was honored in an induction ceremony at the New Jersey Performing Arts Center on May 4, 2008.

2008 inductees
The inaugural class of inductees for the New Jersey Hall of Fame were announced in a press conference on October 25, 2007, by Governor Jon Corzine.

2009 inductees
The 2009 class of inductees for the New Jersey Hall of Fame were announced on February 2, 2009. The induction ceremony was held May 3, 2009, at the New Jersey Performing Arts Center.

2010 inductees
The 2010 class of inductees for the New Jersey Hall of Fame were announced on December 3, 2009. The induction ceremony was held May 2, 2010, at the New Jersey Performing Arts Center in Newark.

2011 inductees
For list of inductees, see footnote

The 9/11 Victims were also given a special induction.

2012 inductees
For a list of inductees, see footnote Ten members of the Class of 2012 were inducted on Saturday, June 9, 2012, during a ceremony at the New Jersey Performing Arts Center: Milt Campbell (Olympian), John Dorrance (condensed-soup inventor), Michael Douglas (actor), Bob Hurley (basketball coach), Wellington Mara (New York Giants owner), Samuel I. Newhouse (media mogul), Annie Oakley (Wild West Show sensation), Joyce Carol Oates (author), Christopher Reeve (late actor-activist), and Sarah Vaughan (jazz singer).

The eleventh member of the Class of 2012 – the E Street Band – will be inducted at a future date. The Unsung Hero Award was given to Eric LeGrand, the paralyzed former Rutgers University defensive tackle.

2013 inductees
For a list of inductees, see footnote

2014 inductees
For a list of inductees, see footnote

2015 inductees
For a list of inductees, see footnote

2016 inductees
For a list of inductees, see footnote

2017 inductees
For a list of inductees, see footnote

2018 inductees
For a list of inductees, see footnote

2019-2020 inductees
For a list of inductees, see footnote These two years had their inductees jointly awarded.

2021 inductees
For a list of inductees, see footnote

See also
Sports Hall of Fame of New Jersey
Grammy Museum Experience
List of people from New Jersey

References

External links
 

Awards established in 2008
Biographical museums in New Jersey
Halls of fame in New Jersey
Museums in Trenton, New Jersey
Proposed museums in the United States
State halls of fame in the United States